Müsli may refer to:

 an alternative spelling of Muesli, a breakfast dish based on raw rolled oats and other ingredients
 a diminutive term for a mouse in Swiss German
 Müsli, Glarus, a hamlet near the village of Elm in the Swiss canton of Glarus